Live im Wasserschloss Klaffenbach is the fifth live DVD from German darkwave band Blutengel. It was released as a DVD, Blu-ray, 2CD and a limited edition 2CD/DVD/Blu-ray set. Footage and audio were recorded at their 'Nemesis - Open Air Festival' concert from Wasserschloss Klaffenbach, Chemnitz, Germany on 17 July 2017.

Track listing

References

Blutengel albums
2018 live albums